Soul Machine is the debut studio album of The Denison/Kimball Trio, released on April 17, 1995 by Skin Graft Records.

Track listing

Personnel 
Adapted from Soul Machine liner notes.

 Duane Denison – electric guitar
 Jim Kimball – drums, brushes, bongos
Additional musicians
 Reg Schrader – bass guitar (5)
 David Wm. Sims – keyboards (2)
 Ken Vandermark – saxophone (8)

Production and additional personnel
 The Denison/Kimball Trio – production
 Mark Fischer – design
 Brad Miller – photography
 Casey Rice – recording

Release history

References

External links 
 

1995 debut albums
The Denison/Kimball Trio albums
Skin Graft Records albums
Instrumental albums